Doharighat is a town and a nagar panchayat in Mau district  in the state of Uttar Pradesh, India.

Transport
The nearest railway station Dohrighat railway station. This city is connected by NH29 route and is between Gorakhpur and Varanasi.

Geography
It has an average elevation of 66 metres (216 feet).

Historical city
Dohrighat is a historical city. Ram and Lord Parsuram meet here then it was the name of Dohrighat. Here situated two temple-like Janki Mandir and Lord Shiva and Famous Ghat is Gauri Shanker Ghat. 

The name: Dohri ghat (Do Hari) comes from the fact that two Vishnu (Hari) avatars met here - 6th avatar Parshuram, and 7th avatar Shri Ram. On the way back from Mithila, after Sita-Ram's marriage, Parshuram met Shri Ram here and tested that He was truly the one who broke Shiva's arrow. This historical place, thus, is known as Doharighat  (Do hari ghat).

The head canal is the second large pumped canal in Asia and its build 5 km from concrete and elevated. The canal was named on famous politician Chaudhary Charan Singh. It is pumped from Ghagra (Saryu) river and through 12 large and medium pumps and then makes canal and it is a lifeline for eastern UP till Balia district. This pump canal was built in the first five-year planning after Independence in 1952.
The religious temple of Lakshman Ji Maharaj is a famous site in Dohrighat. 
This temple is dedicated to Lord Lakshman (Younger Brother of Lord Ram) which is situated on the bank of the Saryu river.

This temple is about 8.5  km from the city.
In the way comes the Divine Mother Durga Temple.

This place is also known for a park known as Muktidham which is situated on the banks of the river Ghaghra. It is a cemetery which is also a park. Here is a statue of Lord Shiva which is very large in size.

Demographics
 India census, Doharighat had a population of 11,799. Males constitute 52% of the population and females 48%. Doharighat has an average literacy rate of 60%, higher than the national average of 59.5%: male literacy is 68% and, female literacy is 52%. In Dohrighat, 16% of the population is under 0 — 6 years of age.

References

This temple is about 8.5 km from Dohrighat

Cities and towns in Mau district